James H. Prescott (October 19, 1934 – December 28, 2005) was an American politician. He served as a Democratic member of the Florida House of Representatives.

Life and career 
Prescott was born in DeFuniak Springs, Florida, the son of Lola and Henry Lee Prescott. He attended Florida State University, graduating in 1960.

In 1962, Prescott was elected to the Florida House of Representatives and served until 1964.

He was also a member of the Florida National Guard.

Prescott died December 28, 2005 at his home while sleeping, at the age of 71, after a long illness. He was survived by his wife Mary Sue Cawthon Prescott and three children.

References 

1934 births
2005 deaths
People from DeFuniak Springs, Florida
Democratic Party members of the Florida House of Representatives
20th-century American politicians
University of Florida alumni